Rajeshkumar Jagdishchandra Ranpura (born 17 July 1983) is an Indian-born cricketer who plays for the Oman national cricket team. Ranpura made his debut for the Omani national side in January 2011, and has played regularly for the side since then. He played in all eight of Oman's matches at the 2012 World Twenty20 Qualifier in the United Arab Emirates, which were accorded full Twenty20 status.

Born in Palanpur, Gujarat, Ranpura's debut for Oman came in January 2011, at the 2011 World Cricket League Division Three tournament. At the 2011 ACC Twenty20 Cup later in the year, he played in all six of Oman's matches, scoring 71 runs and taking two wickets. Ranpura was retained in Oman's side for the 2012 World Twenty20 Qualifier. At the tournament, Oman lost all seven of its group matches to finish bottom of Group B, but defeated Denmark in the 15th-place playoff. Ranpura was one of five players to feature in all of Oman's matches, along with Aamer Ali, Aamer Kaleem, Sultan Ahmed, and Zeeshan Siddiqui. He took five wickets in the tournament at an average of 29.40, behind only Zeeshan (12 wickets) and Hemal Mehta (8) for Oman. His best figures, 2/24 from four overs, came against Ireland.

Since the 2012 World Twenty20 Qualifier, Ranpura has featured regularly for Oman in ACC and ICC limited-overs tournaments, including the 2012 ACC Trophy Elite, 2013 and 2015 ACC Twenty20 Cups, the 2014 ACC Premier League and the 2013 WCL Division Three and 2014 WCL Division Four tournaments. He made his Twenty20 International debut for Oman against Afghanistan in the 2015 ICC World Twenty20 Qualifier tournament on 25 July 2015.

He made his List A debut for Oman in their three-match series against the United Arab Emirates in October 2016.

References

External links
 

1983 births
Living people
Indian cricketers
Indian emigrants to Oman
Indian expatriates in Oman
Omani cricketers
Oman Twenty20 International cricketers
People from Banaskantha district